Klaus Boehnke (born April 23, 1951, in Oldenburg, Germany) is a German psychologist and social scientist. He has been teaching and researching at Jacobs University Bremen since 2002. In 2017, he was appointed deputy director of the Center for Sociocultural Research at the Higher School of Economics (HSE) in Moscow. He suspended this collaboration on February 24, 2022.

Early life 
Boehnke studied English, Russian, and Psychology in Saarbrücken, Bochum, and Berlin. He completed his teacher training in 1975 in Berlin with a state examination in English and Russian. He completed his psychology studies in 1980 at Technische Universität Berlin (TU Berlin – Technical University of Berlin) with an MA-equivalent diploma degree (thesis supervisor Professor Jürgen Bortz). In 1985, also at TU Berlin, he received his doctorate (Dr. phil.) in psychology (doctoral supervisor Professor Rainer K. Silbereisen). In 1992, the Free University of Berlin conferred the so-called habilitation degree on him and bestowed him with the so-called Venia Legendi ("Right to Read") for Psychology (habilitation mentor Professor Hans Merkens).

Career 
Boehnke first worked as a research associate at the Institute of Psychology at TU Berlin, and then in positions roughly equivalent to an assistant, later associate professor at the Institute of General and Comparative Educational Science at the Free University of Berlin. From 1990 to 1992, he worked at the Pedagogy Section of the Humboldt University of Berlin as a DAAD guest lecturer. In 1993, he was appointed to the professorship of Socialization Research and Empirical Social Research at the Institute of Sociology of Chemnitz University of Technology. In 2002, he relinquished his tenure as a civil servant and accepted a professorship for Social Science Methodology at the private then International University Bremen, now Jacobs University.

Boehnke held several long-term guest lectureships, first at the Australian National University in Canberra in 1987, then at the University of Toronto in 1997–98, and in 2008–9 at the National University of Singapore.

From 2000 to 2008, Boehnke served as Secretary General of the International Association for Cross-Cultural Psychology (IACCP) and as its president from 2018 to 2020. He served as President of the Division of Political Psychology of the International Association of Applied Psychology (IAAP) from 2004 to 2010, and as chair of the German Peace Psychology Forum from 2005 to 2013.

Boehnke has received several academic awards, including the Fukuhara Award from the International Council of Psychology (ICP) and most recently the Distinguished Contributions to the International Advancement of Psychology Award from the American Psychological Association as the first German after Paul Baltes.

Boehnke's research focuses on political socialization, social cohesion, and value transmission in cross-cultural comparison. He has published 14 monographs and 7 edited volumes, about 150 articles in peer-reviewed journals, and about 160 book chapters.

Personal life 
He is married to Mandy Boehnke, Vice President of the University of Bremen. He has four children.

References 

1951 births
Living people
German psychologists
People from Oldenburg (city)
Technical University of Berlin alumni
Academic staff of Jacobs University Bremen